Carl Charles Mohler (December 26, 1898 – January 27, 1969) was an American politician in the state of Washington. He served in the Washington State Senate and Washington House of Representatives. From 1945 to 1949, he was President pro tempore of the Senate.

References

Democratic Party Washington (state) state senators
1898 births
1969 deaths
Democratic Party members of the Washington House of Representatives